Vernon A. Carey Jr. (born February 25, 2001) is an American professional basketball player who last played for the Washington Wizards of the National Basketball Association (NBA). He played college basketball for the Duke Blue Devils. He finished his high school career at NSU University School as a five star recruit and among the top-ranked players in the 2019 class.

High school career
Carey starred for four years at University School of Nova Southeastern University in Fort Lauderdale, Florida. During his freshman season, he averaged 18.0 points, 7.0 rebounds, and 2.0 blocks while leading the Sharks to a 15–9 overall record. As a sophomore, Carey averaged 22.0 points and 8.0 rebounds per game, while leading his team to a 20–7 record and a Florida district state championship. After his sophomore year, Carey was named to the 2017 Miami Herald and Sun Sentinel all-district teams as well as 2017 MaxPreps All-American honorable mention.

As a junior, Carey averaged 26.0 points and 10.1 rebounds a game, while leading the Sharks to an overall record of 36–2, the 2018 Florida 5A state championship, and championships at the 2017 City of Palms Invitational and the 2017 John Wall Invitational. Carey led his team to the finals at the High School National Tournament, losing in the championship game to Montverde Academy and its star, RJ Barrett.

Carey averaged 17.4 points and 5.3 rebounds per game on the Nike Elite Youth Basketball League (EYBL) Circuit for his AAU team, Nike Team Florida.

Carey finished his senior season averaging 21.7 points, 9.0 rebounds and 1.1 blocks per game. The 2018–19  University team with a supporting cast of Scottie Barnes, Taylor Hendricks Jace and Jett Howard, successfully defended its FHSSA Class 5A State championship with a victory over Andrew Jackson High School, despite Carey being sidelined for the championship game.

Recruiting
On December 6, 2018, Carey announced on SportsCenter that he was committed to attend Duke University. He made the announcement on the one year anniversary of his grandfather's passing.

At the end of his senior season, Carey was ranked the 6th best player in the country, rated a five-star recruit by all major recruiting services, and selected to play in the 2019 McDonald's All-American Boys Game and the Jordan Brand Classic.

College career

Before the start of the 2019–20 season, Carey was named to the John R. Wooden Award Preseason Top 50 list  as well as the Naismith, Kareem Abdul-Jabbar Award, and Lute Olson Award preseason watchlists.

On November 12, Carey recorded his first double-double of the season scoring 17 points and 10 rebounds in a 105–54 win against Central Arkansas. On November 15, Carey scored a career high 20 points and grabbed 10 rebounds in a 74–63 win over Georgia State. On November 21, Carey scored a career-high 31 points and 12 rebounds  in an 87–52 win over California. On the next night, Carey recorded 20 points and 10 rebounds in an 81–73 victory over Georgetown, and was named MVP of the 2K Sports Classic tournament. Carey would earn  both player and freshman of the week honors in the Atlantic Coast Conference (ACC).

On December 3, Carey scored 26 points, 11 rebounds, and 3 blocks in an 87–75 win against Michigan State in the ACC-Big Ten Challenge. On December 19, Carey posted another double-double of 20 points and 10 rebounds in an 86–57 win over Wofford. On December 23, Carey was named ACC freshman of the week for the third consecutive time. On January 4, Carey scored 24 points and grabbed nine rebounds in a 95–62 win against Miami. On January 28, Carey erupted for 26 points and 13 rebounds in a 79–67 victory over Pittsburgh. On February 1, Carey scored 26 points and a career-high 17 rebounds in a 97–88 win against Syracuse. At the conclusion of the regular season, Carey was named ACC Freshman of the Year and was selected to the First Team All-ACC. Carey averaged 17.8 points, 8.8 rebounds and 1.6 blocks per game as a freshman, earning National Freshman of the Year honors from the U.S. Basketball Writers Association and the National Association of Basketball Coaches. Following the season he declared for the 2020 NBA draft.

Professional career

Charlotte Hornets (2020–2022) 
Carey was taken by the Charlotte Hornets with the 32nd pick of the 2020 NBA draft. On November 30, 2020, he signed a multi-year contract with the Hornets. Carey made his NBA debut on December 30, playing four minutes in a 118–99 win over the Dallas Mavericks. On April 16, 2021, he scored a career-high 21 points, alongside six rebounds, in a 115–130 loss to the Brooklyn Nets.

During his rookie and sophomore seasons, Carey received multiple assignments to the Greensboro Swarm, Charlotte's NBA G League affiliate.

Washington Wizards (2022–2023) 
On February 10, 2022, Carey was traded, alongside Ish Smith, to the Washington Wizards in exchange for Montrezl Harrell. On April 10, Carey recorded a season-high 11 points, alongside seven rebounds, in a 108–124 loss to the Charlotte Hornets.

On March 1, 2023, Carey was waived by the Wizards.

Career statistics

NBA

|-
| style="text-align:left;"| 
| style="text-align:left;"| Charlotte
| 19 || 4 || 6.1 || .500 || .143 || .818 || 1.4 || .1 || .1 || .3 || 2.4
|-
| style="text-align:left;"| 
| style="text-align:left;"| Charlotte
| 4 || 1 || 4.3 || .500 || — || .667 || 1.3 || .0 || .3 || .0 || 2.0
|-
| style="text-align:left;"| 
| style="text-align:left;"| Washington
| 3 || 0 || 9.0 || .571 || — || .400 || 2.3 || .0 || .3 || .3 || 4.0
|-
| style="text-align:left;"| 
| style="text-align:left;"| Washington
| 11 || 0 || 2.5 || .250 || — || 1.000 || 1.0 || .3 || .2 || .2 || .5
|- class="sortbottom"
| style="text-align:center;" colspan="2"| Career
| 37 || 5 || 5.1 || .474 || .143 || .654 || 1.4 || .1 || .1 || .2 || 1.9

College

|-
| style="text-align:left;"| 2019–20
| style="text-align:left;"| Duke
| 31 || 30 || 24.9 || .577 || .381 || .670 || 8.8 || 1.0 || .7 || 1.6 || 17.8

Personal life
Carey is the son of Latavia and Vernon Carey, who played with the NFL's Miami Dolphins from 2004 to 2011.

References

External links
Duke Blue Devils bio

2001 births
Living people
21st-century African-American sportspeople
African-American basketball players
All-American college men's basketball players
American men's basketball players
Basketball players from Florida
Capital City Go-Go players
Centers (basketball)
Charlotte Hornets draft picks
Charlotte Hornets players
Duke Blue Devils men's basketball players
Greensboro Swarm players
McDonald's High School All-Americans
NSU University School alumni
People from Southwest Ranches, Florida
Power forwards (basketball)
Sportspeople from the Miami metropolitan area
Washington Wizards players